The fifth season of the animated television series Rick and Morty consisted of 10 episodes, part of the 70 episodes ordered by Adult Swim after they renewed the series in 2018. The series stars Justin Roiland as both titular characters. The season premiered on June 20, 2021 and concluded on September 5, 2021.

Cast and characters

Main 
 Justin Roiland as Rick Sanchez and Morty Smith, the show's two lead characters. Rick is often shown as drunk and Morty is shown as nervous and unsure of himself, often in doubt of Rick's many extravagant adventures.
 Chris Parnell as Jerry Smith, Morty and Summer's father and Rick's son-in-law.
 Spencer Grammer as Summer Smith, Morty's older sister and Rick's granddaughter.
 Sarah Chalke as Beth Smith, Morty and Summer's mother and Rick's daughter, who's also a horse surgeon.

Recurring 
 Kari Wahlgren as Jessica, Morty's long-time crush whom he seldom has the courage to ask out
 Keith David as United States President Curtis / The President, the President of the United States, and the Turkey President

Guests 
 Dan Harmon as Birdperson / Phoenixperson, one of Rick's allies previously transformed into a killing machine by Tamantha "Tammy" Gueterman.
 Harmon also portrays Mr. Nimbus, Rick's long-time enemy introduced in the season.
 Jim Gaffigan as Hoovy, a goat-like inhabitant of a parallel universe which runs on "Narnia Time".
 Tom Kenny as Japheth, Hoovy's son.
 Jeff Loveness as Japheth's Son 
 Alison Brie as Planetina, an environmental super-heroine on whom Morty has a crush. She is heavily based on Captain Planet.
 Steve Buscemi as Eddie, a member of the Tina-Teers
 Lauren Tom as Xing Ho, a member of the Tina-Teers / Air, a member of the Tina Teers
Lauren Tom as Kendra, a member of GoGotron
 Brandon Johnson as Water, a member of the Tina-Teers
 Dan Harmon as Arabic Ambassador
 Rob Schrab as Diesel Weasel
 Jennifer Coolidge as Daphne, an alien from Morglutz
 Fred Stoller as a Ferkus 9 inhabitant
 Michelle Buteau as the Sperm Queen
 Christina Ricci as Princess Poñeta, the princess of the CHUD
 Christina Ricci also voices Kathy Ireland
 Darren Criss as Bruce Chutback, a new kid at Morty's high school.
 Darren Criss also voices Naruto Smith
 Timothy Olyphant as Coop
 Cassie Steele as Tamantha "Tammy" Gueterman
 Tom Kenny as Squanchy and additional voices.

Episodes

Production

Development 
Dan Harmon and Scott Marder said that season 5 would have a stronger sense of continuity than previous seasons. At a 2020 virtual Adult Swim festival, writer Scott Marder announced that "there's epic canon in season five coming" and that season four's Space Beth is set to be a major character in the season. As of late October 2020, episodes were "pretty far along on [their] route to Adult Swim." A promotional animatic of Morty carrying a seemingly dead Rick across an alien planet was released in November 2020. Other animatics, including one that appears to be from the same episode as Rick is in the same condition he is in in the first picture, have been released as well. A final animatic shows Morty confessing his feelings for Jessica as their spaceship crashes into the ocean. Once it does, Rick's long-time nemesis Mr. Nimbus greets them. Sixth and seventh seasons have been confirmed to already be in development.

Writing 
In October 2020, show creator Dan Harmon revealed that one of the episodes written by Rob Schrab in the upcoming season, now known as "A Rickconvenient Mort", would be about Morty's relationship with a woman who is not Jessica, and said that Morty "really feels heartache on a level a man his age shouldn't... my Emmy is going to that one." Schrab's writing for the episode was "very tender." Harmon also noted that production was happening ahead of schedule. Jeff Loveness, who wrote multiple episodes in season four, has been confirmed to be returning to write his last episodes for the series, including the season premiere. The season also delved deeper into Rick and Jerry's relationship.

Casting 
Regulars Justin Roiland, Chris Parnell, Spencer Grammer, and Sarah Chalke were confirmed to return as the Smith family, with other characters including new addition to the cast, Mr. Nimbus. In January 2021, it was revealed that series creator Dan Harmon and Kari Wahlgren, a recurring voice in the series, would return to reprise their roles of Birdperson, Rick's old friend turned enemy after being reprogrammed by Tammy Gueterman, and Jessica, Morty's crush throughout the show, respectively. Space Beth, a character who last appeared in the finale of the previous season, voiced by Chalke, also returned. Guest stars during the season will include Timothy Olyphant, Christina Ricci, and Alison Brie.

Release 
The season premiered on June 20, 2021. Justin Roiland, who voices the two main characters, said that he would like to air one episode a month, so as to lengthen the time that the show is on the air. He reiterated this in March 2021. Roiland also claimed that the wait between all the rest of the seasons would "never be [as] long again" as they were between many of the previous seasons. On July 13, 2021, the seventh episode, "Gotron Jerrysis Rickvangelion", was leaked online in Canada through Amazon Prime Video, ahead of its official release date of August 1. It was removed shortly thereafter.

Reception 

On the review aggregator Rotten Tomatoes, season five has a 86% score based on 100 reviews, with an average rating of 8.10/10. The site's critics consensus reads, "Bold, bombastic, and just the right amount of baffling, Rick and Morty'''s fifth season is an action-packed journey that may finally put Rick in his place." On Metacritic, the season has a score of 89, out of 5 reviews, indicating "universal acclaim". Brandon Katz of Observer said "Rick and Morty persists not only for its inversion of sci-fi tropes, clever pop culture riffing and raw hilarity. It continues to hold our interest in a way few shows do because it knows we are all capable of great and terrible things." David Opie of Digital Spy'' praised the series premiere, saying "It's just as inventive as ever, and by not resetting the status quo, there's more room for character development."

Notes

References

External links 

Rick and Morty seasons
2021 American television seasons